The Maple Leaf 48 is a Canadian sailboat that was designed by Stan Huntingford as a motorsailer and first built in 1972.

Production
The design was built by Cooper Enterprises in Port Coquitlam, British Columbia, starting in 1972, but the company went out of business in 1990 and it is now out of production.

Design
The Maple Leaf 48 is a recreational keelboat, built predominantly of fibreglass, with wood trim. It has a cutter rig, a raked stem, a reverse transom, a skeg-mounted rudder controlled by a wheel and a fixed fin keel. It displaces  and carries  of lead ballast.

The design has sleeping accommodation for nine people, with a single and a double berth in the bow cabin, a settee berth in the forward main salon, two berths in the aft main salon and an aft cabin with a double berth on the port side and a single on the starboard side. The galley is located on the port side just forward of the companionway ladder. The galley is "U"-shaped and is equipped with a stove and a double sink. A navigation station is opposite the galley, on the starboard side. There are two heads, one just aft of the bow cabin on the starboard side and one on the port side in the aft cabin.

For sailing downwind the design may be equipped with a symmetrical spinnaker.

Operational history
In 1984 review in Yachting magazine, Chris Caswell wrote, "the Maple Leaf series (48, 50, 54, 56 and 68) is distinctive for powerful hulls, graceful deckhouses, and center cockpits.

See also
List of sailing boat types

References

Keelboats
1970s sailboat type designs
Sailing yachts 
Motorsailers
Sailboat type designs by Stan Huntingford
Sailboat types built by Cooper Enterprises